Harjit Harman is an Indian singer.

Harman released his solo album Zanjeeri in 2002. He has since produced several albums including Panjebaan, Mundri and Hoor. In 2011, his album Shaan-E-Quam (Pride of the Nation) was nominated for the Global Indian Music Awards in the category "Best Folk Album".

Filmography

Discography

Achievements and awards 
 Shaan-E-Quam was nominated for IGMA Awards.

References

External links
Official website

Bhangra (music)
Indian male singers
Living people
Punjabi people
1975 births